Haughton v Smith was a judicial case in which the House of Lords ruled that it was impossible to commit the crime of handling stolen goods where the goods were not stolen; nor could an offence of attempting to handle them be committed in such circumstances. The latter part of the ruling was partially overturned by the Criminal Attempts Act 1981.

Judgement
Viscount Dilhorne's statement about the impossibility of crimes still often quoted after a 1981 as regards barring the full-offence charge for completed alleged offences (for which full mens rea can be shown) but where the subject matter did not in the event amount to something prohibited:

This case was partially overturned as it would relate to inchoate (incomplete) offences, which can be prosecuted by the Criminal Attempts Act 1981.  of the law of attempted crimes, in particular the debate about criminal liability in issues of impossible crimes.

References

Decision

English criminal case law
House of Lords cases
1975 in England
1975 in case law
1975 in British law